United Nations Security Council resolution 898, adopted unanimously on 23 February 1994, after reaffirming Resolution 782 (1992) and all subsequent resolutions on Mozambique, the Council discussed the implementation of the Rome General Peace Accords and established a 1,144 strong police component of the United Nations Operation in Mozambique (ONUMOZ).

After reviewing the status of the ONUMOZ mission, the importance of the General Peace Agreement and its timely implementation by all parties was reiterated. Positive developments were welcomed though there were still some delays. A request by the Government of Mozambique and RENAMO was noted regarding observation of police activities and in this regard, the Secretary-General Boutros Boutros-Ghali recommended the establishment of a police component of ONUMOZ with a view to reducing the military component.

A police component of up to 1,144 personnel was established. The Secretary-General was requested to prepare for the withdrawal of part of the military component and to draw plans for the completion of the ONUMOZ mandate by November 1994, when an elected government is in office. Timetables were also to be drawn for the withdrawal of military observers after demilitarisation had taken place and for the drawdown of military forces in the transportation corridors when the new national defence force was operational.

Recent positive developments including the commencement of the assembly of troops, dismantling of paramilitary militias, the electoral law and the appointment of the National Electoral Commission, were welcomed. At the same time there was concern at delays including the demobilisation and the formation of a national army. The two parties were called on to implement the peace agreement, and in particular the ceasefire and demobilisation and cantonment of forces. They were also asked to prepare for elections no later than October 1994.

The international community was asked to help contribute to the demobilisation of troops and the training of the new defense army in Mozambique. It was also important to ensure the return of refugees and displaced persons. The Secretary-General was requested to ensure maximum economy in the operations of ONUMOZ, with the Council awaiting his next report on progress and the timetable by which ONUMOZ's mandate will be reviewed.

See also
 Elections in Mozambique
 History of Mozambique
 List of United Nations Security Council Resolutions 801 to 900 (1993–1994)

References

External links
 
Text of the Resolution at undocs.org

 0898
1994 in Mozambique
Mozambican Civil War
 0898
February 1994 events